John Williams (10 February 1777 – 15 September 1846) was an English Whig politician, lawyer and judge.

John Williams was educated at Trinity College, Cambridge. He was elected as a Member of Parliament (MP) for Lincoln at a by-election in March 1822, and held the seat until the 1826 general election, when he was returned on 9 June for Ilchester. However, that result was overturned on 22 February 1827 after an election petition, and Williams did not return to the House of Commons until February 1830, when he was returned for Winchelsea at a by-election. He held that seat until the borough was disenfranchised at the 1832 general election.

References

External links 
 

1777 births
1846 deaths
Alumni of Trinity College, Cambridge
Whig (British political party) MPs
Members of the Parliament of the United Kingdom for English constituencies
UK MPs 1820–1826
UK MPs 1826–1830
UK MPs 1830–1831
UK MPs 1831–1832
Politics of Lincoln, England
19th-century English judges